Alfredo Grisi Solórzano (31 July 1900 – 7 July 1978) was a Mexican fencer. He competed in the individual foil event at the 1948 Summer Olympics.

References

External links
 

1900 births
1978 deaths
Mexican male foil fencers
Olympic fencers of Mexico
Fencers at the 1948 Summer Olympics
Fencers from Mexico City